Walsall North is a constituency created in 1955 represented in the House of Commons of the UK Parliament since 2017 by Eddie Hughes, a member of the Conservative Party.  The local electorate returned a Labour MP in the seat's first seventeen general elections; in the following election Eddie Hughes became its second Conservative MP following an earlier by-election win by his party in 1976.  The seat consists of green-buffered urban areas with golf courses, parks and sports fields between the half of the former metalworking and manufacturing-centred town and main other settlement, Bloxwich within its boundaries.

Members of Parliament

Constituency profile

The constituency is in the heart of an area traditionally focused on manufacturing which retains many mechanical and engineering jobs in its economy.

Workless claimants, registered jobseekers, were in November 2012 significantly higher than the national average of 3.8%, at 8.0% of the population based on a statistical compilation by The Guardian, not the highest in the region which was Birmingham Ladywood at 11.1% but also significantly higher than the average for the region, 4.7%.

Boundaries

Walsall North is one of three constituencies covering the Metropolitan Borough of Walsall.

1983–present: The Metropolitan Borough of Walsall wards of Birchills Leamore, Blakenall, Bloxwich East, Bloxwich West, Short Heath, Willenhall North, and Willenhall South.

1974–1983: As 1955-1974 less Hatherton, plus Bentley, Willenhall North, and Willenhall South.

1955–1974: The County Borough of Walsall wards of Birchills, Blakenall, Bloxwich East, Bloxwich West, Hatherton, and Leamore, and the Urban District of Brownhills.

History
Results between 1955 and 1979
The seat was created in 1955 from part of Walsall.  Its first Member of Parliament was W.T. Wells of the Labour Party, who had been the MP for Walsall. In 1974, he was succeeded by controversial Labour MP John Stonehouse, who was appointed Postmaster General and became infamous for faking his own death, being later jailed for fraud.  After resigning from the party in April 1976, he was invited to join the English National Party, becoming their first (and only) MP, before being forced to resign as an MP in August 1976.  The ensuing by-election was won by Robin Hodgson, a Conservative.

Results since 1979
Labour regained the seat in 1979; their candidate was the former Croydon South MP David Winnick, who represented the constituency until 2017. Aside from a marginal majority in 1987 of 3.7%, Winnick's wins from and including 1979 ranged between 7.3% and 29% (the latter twice) until 2010. He fended off a strong challenge from Conservative Helyn Clack, who he beat by 2.7% of the vote in 2010. Going into the 2015 general election, Walsall North was 13th on the list of Conservative target seats. Winnick increased his majority to 1,937 — 5.2% of the vote. The 2015 result gave the seat the 22nd-smallest majority of Labour's 232 seats by percentage of majority.

Other parties since 1979
Conservative candidates finished runner-up in each election from and including 1979, winning in 2017.

The UKIP swing of +17.2% in 2015, coming the year before the UK's EU membership referendum, was higher than the national average of 9.5%. The Liberal Democrat, TUSC and Green Party candidates of 2015 won less than 5% of the vote, so lost their deposits.

The Liberal Democrats managed to produce their best result since the seat's 1955 creation (counting their two predecessor parties) in 1983, when Liberal A. Bentley polled 20.7% of the vote. In 2005 and 2010, the BNP saved their deposit by polling more than 5% of the vote. The last time this percentage had been reached by a candidate in Walsall North in other than the top three parties had been 1976.

Elections

Elections in the 2010s

Elections in the 2000s

Elections in the 1990s

Elections in the 1980s

Elections in the 1970s

Elections in the 1960s

Elections in the 1950s

See also
 List of parliamentary constituencies in the West Midlands (county)

Notes

References

Politics of Walsall
Parliamentary constituencies in the West Midlands (county)
Constituencies of the Parliament of the United Kingdom established in 1955